The Allaipiddy massacre or Allaipiddy murders refers to the May 13, 2006 killing of 13 minority Tamil civilians in separate incidents in three villages in the islet of Kayts in northern Sri Lanka.

Incident
The massacre took place on the night of May 13, 2006 in the villages of Allaipiddy, Puliyankoodal, and Vangalady. In all three incidents, Sri Lankan Navy entered a home and opened fire on the residents. The deadliest incident took place in Allaipiddy, where nine people, including two children, died. Three more were killed in Puliyankoodal and one in Vangalady. Several people were wounded. The killings took place two days after the Liberation Tigers of Tamil Eelam (LTTE) launched a suicide assault on a naval convoy in which 18 sailors died.

At least 150 people fled Allaipiddy after the massacre. Refugees who reached the de facto rebel capital Killinochchi, who spoke through an LTTE translator, alleged harassment by the Sri Lankan Navy and accused it of carrying out the massacre.

Reactions
The Sri Lankan government denounced the killings and blamed the LTTE, suggesting that the massacre "could very well be a part of the LTTE strategy to divert international opinion". The LTTE, meanwhile, blamed the government.

The International Crisis Group identified the Sri Lankan Navy and members of the Eelam People’s Democratic Party, an anti-LTTE Tamil political party and paramilitary organization, as the most likely culprits.
The local human rights group University Teachers for Human Rights stated that it had confirmed the involvement of Navy personnel and EPDP members
and Amnesty International acknowledged that it had "received credible reports that Sri Lanka Navy personnel and armed cadres affiliated with the [EPDP] ... were present at the scene of the killings".

After the massacre, Anglican Bishop Duleep de Chickera visited Allaipiddy as part of a fact-finding mission to northern Sri Lanka. In his report he stated:

Investigation
Local newspapers have reported that the investigation into the murders has stalled in Kayts District Courts due to lack of cooperation from various involved parties.

See also
 St. Philip Neri Church bombing

References

External links
Killing match in Lanka
Promoting Adherence to International Human Rights Standards
Pax-Christi report on follow up to Allaipiddy massacre

2006 crimes in Sri Lanka
Eelam People's Democratic Party
Attacks on civilians attributed to the Sri Lanka Navy
Massacres in Sri Lanka
Mass murder in 2006
Mass murder of Sri Lankan Tamils
Sri Lankan government forces attacks in Eelam War IV
Terrorist incidents in Sri Lanka in 2006